The Australian Association of Mathematics Teachers is the main representative organisation of mathematics teachers in Australia. Membership is via affiliated state organisations. The AAMT conducts a number of activities including Reach for the stars,  an activity for students, as well as submissions to government bodies and reports on issues relevant to mathematics teaching.

Structure
The AAMT is a federation of 8 affiliated associations of teachers of mathematics, one from each Australian State and Territory: 

The AAMT is governed by a council made up of a representatives from each of these associations, as well as an elected President, Treasurer, and either a President Elect or an Immediate Past President.

The day-to-day affairs of the association are managed by an office staff based primarily in Canberra, Australian Capital Territory.

Membership
AAMT does not direct membership; members join their local affiliated association and are then automatically a member of AAMT. AAMT has approximately 4000 individual and institutional members.

Standards
The AAMT publish Standards for Excellence in Teaching Mathematics in Australian Schools as a guide for the improvement and maintenance of teaching standards in mathematics in Australian schools.

Journals
The AAMT publishes three journals:
 Australian Primary Mathematics Classroom (APMC) - primary school mathematics education
 The Australian Mathematics Education Journal (AMEJ) - (Secondary school up to early tertiary level)
The AMEJ superseded AAMT's earlier publications in 2019. These were:
 The Australian Mathematics Teacher (AMT) - secondary school mathematics up to age 16
 Australian Senior Mathematics Journal (ASMJ) - senior secondary (Years 11 and 12) and early tertiary mathematics.

References

External links

Educational organisations based in Australia
Professional associations based in Australia
Mathematics organizations
Teaching in Australia